Sphaerodactylus argus, also known commonly as the ocellated gecko, the ocellated sphaero, and the stippled sphaero, is a species of lizard in the family Sphaerodactylidae. The species is indigenous to the Caribbean. There are two recognized subspecies

Etymology
The specific name, argus, refers to Argus, the many-eyed giant in Greek mythology, an allusion to the ocelli (eye spots) of this species.

Geographic range
S. argus is native only to Jamaica . It is also found in Cuba and on adjacent islets, in the Bahamas, and in the Yucatan Peninsula of Mexico. S. argus can be found in the Florida Keys, where it has well-established populations, though it was not native there.

Habitat
A climbing species, it can also be seen on walls and in buildings.

Diet
S. argus feeds on insects and other small invertebrates.

Reproduction
S. argus is oviparous.

Subspecies
Two subspecies are recognized as being valid, including the nominotypical subspecies.
Sphaerodactylus argus andresensis 
Sphaerodactylus argus argus

References

Further reading
Dunn ER, Saxe LH (1950). "Results of the Catherwood-Chaplin West Indies Expedition, 1948. Part 5. Amphibians and Reptiles of San Andrés and Providencia". Proceedings of the Academy of Natural Sciences of Philadelphia 102: 141–165. (Sphaerodactylus argus andresensis, new subspecies, p. 148).
Powell R, Conant R, Collins JT (2016). Peterson Field Guide to Reptiles and Amphibians of Eastern and Central North America, Fourth Edition. Boston and New York: Houghton Mifflin Harcourt. xiv + 494 pp., 47 Plates, 207 Figures. . (Sphaerodactylus argus, p. 269 + Plate 24).

External links
http://www.discoverlife.org/mp/20q?search=Sphaerodactylus+argus

Sphaerodactylus
Gecko
Reptiles described in 1850
Taxa named by Philip Henry Gosse